The Proposal is a 1957 Australian television play based on the play A Marriage Proposal by Anton Chekhov. It was made at a time when Australian drama production was rare and mostly adaptations of overseas shows.

Plot
In the 1880s a suitor tries to propose to an attractive girl under the eye of her father. The suitor keeps saying the wrong thing.

Cast
Paul Bacon as the suitor
Douglas Kelly as the father
Bettine Kauffmann as the girl

Production
It was filmed in Melbourne using popular radio actors of the time.

Chris Muir recalled the air-conditioning broke down in the studio and the actors came close to fainting.

See also
List of live television plays broadcast on Australian Broadcasting Corporation (1950s)

References

External links

1950s Australian television plays
1957 television plays